When The Tide Turns is a 1989 folk music album by Vin Garbutt.

Track listing
 Where the Hell are we Going to Live
 When the Tide Turns
 The Ballad of John Pearson
 Lady Anne Montgomery
 Nica Nicaragua
 Absent Friends
 The Jolly Butchers/The London Lassies
 Carol Anne Kelly
 Not for the First Time
 I Wouldn't Have One Myself
 The Secret

1989 albums
Vin Garbutt albums